Metarhizium pinghaense is a species of entomopathogenic fungus in the family Clavicipitaceae. Some authorities have it as a synonym of Metarhizium anisopliae. DNA studies show that it is a good species, with strong bootstrap support. 

Researchers in Burkina Faso have created a strain of M. metarhizium genetically engineered to produce the venom of an Australian funnel-web spider; exposure to the fungus caused populations of anopheles mosquitoes, which spread malaria, to crash by 99% in a controlled trial.

References

External links

Clavicipitaceae
Hypocreales genera
Biological pest control
Fungi described in 1996